James Michael Armstrong (14 July 1917 – 8 July 1981) was an Australian sport wrestler and rugby league player. He was born in Albury, New South Wales, and worked as a police officer.

Armstrong was selected to play for Australia against Great Britain as a front row forward in the third and deciding Ashes test in 1946, becoming Kangaroo No. 233. He won a bronze medal in freestyle wrestling, heavyweight class, at the 1948 Summer Olympics in London.

At the 1950 British Empire Games Armstrong won the heavyweight wrestling gold medal.

At the 1962 British Empire and Commonwealth Games Armstrong won the light heavyweight wrestling bronze medal.

References

1917 births
1981 deaths
Rugby league players from Albury, New South Wales
Sportspeople from Albury
Australian police officers
Australian rugby league players
South Sydney Rabbitohs players
City New South Wales rugby league team players
New South Wales rugby league team players
Australia national rugby league team players
Wrestlers at the 1948 Summer Olympics
Australian male sport wrestlers
Olympic wrestlers of Australia
Olympic bronze medalists for Australia
Olympic medalists in wrestling
Commonwealth Games medallists in wrestling
Commonwealth Games gold medallists for Australia
Commonwealth Games bronze medallists for Australia
Wrestlers at the 1950 British Empire Games
Wrestlers at the 1962 British Empire and Commonwealth Games
Medalists at the 1948 Summer Olympics
South Sydney Rabbitohs captains
Medallists at the 1962 British Empire and Commonwealth Games